Suyt'uqucha (Quechua suyt'u, sayt'u rectangular, qucha lake, lagoon, "rectangular lake", hispanicized spelling Suytuccocha) is a lake in Peru located in the Apurímac Region, Andahuaylas Province, Andahuaylas District. Suyt'uqucha lies southwest of Antaqucha ("copper lake") of the San Jerónimo District.

See also
List of lakes in Peru

References

Lakes of Peru
Lakes of Apurímac Region